Eupithecia opistographata is a moth in the family Geometridae. It is found in Turkmenistan, Iran, Pakistan and China.

References

Moths described in 1906
opistographata
Moths of Asia